Estoloides aquilonius is a species of beetle in the family Cerambycidae. It was described by Linsley and Chemsak in 1984. It is known from the United States.

References

Estoloides
Beetles described in 1984